Arnold van Boonen (16 December 1669 – 2 October 1729) was a Dutch  portrait painter.

Life
He was born at Dordrecht, in the Dutch Republic in 1669. He was a pupil first of Arnold Verbuis, and then of Godefried Schalken. He painted genre pictures in the style of the latter, representing subjects by candlelight, but met with such encouragement in portrait painting that he devoted himself almost wholly to that branch of art. His style was well adapted to succeed in it. An excellent colourist, a faithful designer of his model, and highly skilled, he was soon distinguished as one of the ablest artists of his day. He painted a great number of portraits of the most distinguished people of his time, among whom were Peter the Great, the Elector of Mentz, the Landgrave of Hesse-Darmstadt, the Prince and Princess of Orange, the great Duke of Marlborough, and several others. He painted some large pictures for the halls of the different companies at Amsterdam and Dordrecht. He died in 1729.

The Dresden Gallery has seven works by him, and the Woman Singing in the Lille Gallery is also attributed to him. His son, Kasper van Boonen, also painted portraits, but in no way proved himself equal to his father.

Gallery

References

Sources
 

1669 births
1729 deaths
Artists from Dordrecht
18th-century Dutch painters
18th-century Dutch male artists
Dutch male painters
Dutch portrait painters